The BMW H2R ("Hydrogen Record Car") is a racecar adapted to run on liquid hydrogen fuel. It was conceived and developed in 10 months under the direction of Dr. Raymond Freymann.

The H2R’s 6.0-liter V12 engine, which draws on BMW's Valvetronic and Double-VANOS technology, is based on the 760i’s gasoline-fueled powerplant.

Technical data
In 2004 on the high-speed track at the Miramas Proving Grounds in France, the BMW H2R set nine international and FIA-ratified records for cars with hydrogen combustion engines.

 Maximum speed: 
 Engine: twelve-cylinder ICE, running on hydrogen
 Bodyshell: aluminium space frame structure
 Outer shell: carbon fibre-reinforced plastic
 Vehicle weight including driver: 
 Drag coefficient (cw): 0.21

BMW Art Car Project: Your Mobile Expectations
In 2007, Olafur Eliasson was commissioned by BMW to create the sixteenth art car for the BMW Art Car Project based on the H2R. Eliasson and his team removed the automobile's alloy body and instead replaced it with a new interlocking framework of reflective steel bars and mesh. Layers of ice were created by spraying approximately 530 gallons of water during a period of several days upon the structure. On display, the frozen sculpture is glowing from within. Called Your Mobile Expectations, the vehicle was on special display in a temperature controlled room at the San Francisco Museum of Modern Art from September 8, 2007 to January 13, 2008.

Records

See also
List of hydrogen internal combustion engine vehicles

Publications
 R. Freymann, W. Strobl, J. Kübler; Hydrogen Technology in Automotive Engineering: Sustainable, Clean and Powerful. Conf. Proc. of the „First Austrian Hydrogen Conference“, HYCentA, Graz (Austria), 10-11 Oct. 2005

References

External links

 BMW Hydrogen power program
 BMW H2R World Record Attempt Video Footage

H2R
Hydrogen cars